The Aruba women's national football team is the national women's football team of Aruba and is overseen by the Arubaanse Voetbal Bond.

Results and fixtures

The following is a list of match results in the last 12 months, as well as any future matches that have been scheduled.

Legend

2022

Coaching staff

Managerial history

 Mildred Wever (2011)
 Reinhard Breinburg (2019–2020)
 Glenford Sambo (2022–)

Players

Current squad
The following players were called up for the matches against El Salvador and Barbados on 19 and 22 February 2022.

Caps and goals as of 18 September 2021 after the match against .

Competitive record

FIFA Women's World Cup

*Draws include knockout matches decided on penalty kicks.

Olympic Games

*Draws include knockout matches decided on penalty kicks.

CONCACAF W Championship

*Draws include knockout matches decided on penalty kicks.

All-time record

See also
Sport in Aruba
Football in Aruba
Women's football in Aruba
Aruba men's national football team

References

External links
Official website
FIFA Profile

Caribbean women's national association football teams
women